Rainmaker Mountain (also known as Mount Pioa) is the name of a mountain located near Pago Pago, American Samoa on Tutuila Island. Rainmaker Mountain traps rain clouds and gives Pago Pago the highest annual rainfall of any harbor.  The average annual rainfall on the mountain is around 200 inches (5 m). It has a three-pronged summit. Rainmaker Mountain and its base were designated a National Natural Landmark in 1972 due to the slopes’ tropical vegetation.

Rainmaker Mountain is one of several giant volcanic mountains that created Tutuila Island. It dominates the scene from nearly every point in Pago Pago Harbor. It comprises three mountain peaks: North Pioa, South Pioa, and Sinapioa. The peaks range in elevation from 1,619 to 1,718 feet. The 170-acre designated landmark area occurs above the 800-foot contour line. Several endemic species are only present here and on Matafao Peak, the highest point on Tutuila.

Rainmaker Mountain, famous in Samoan legend and lore, is also geologically important as an example of a volcanic plug (quartz trachyte). The upper slopes are montane rainforest and the crest is montane scrub. 

The mountain is a volcanic feature known as a trachyte plug, a volcanic intrusion made of extrusive igneous rocks having alkali feldspar and minor mafic minerals as the main components and a fine-grained, generally porphyritic texture.

A closeup of the mountain is visible up Rainmaker Pass.

Rainmaker Hotel was a hotel at the port entrance under the mountain.

See also
List of National Natural Landmarks in American Samoa

References

 https://web.archive.org/web/20061005005025/http://www2.nature.nps.gov/geology/parks/npsa/index.cfm

External links
 National Park Service site for Rainmaker Mountain

Mountains of American Samoa
Tutuila
National Natural Landmarks in American Samoa
Volcanoes of American Samoa
Volcanic plugs of the United States